Velikoye is a rural locality (a village) in Kubenskoye Rural Settlement, Vologodsky District, Vologda Oblast, Russia. The population was 30 as of 2002.

Geography 
The distance to Vologda is 45 km, to Kubenskoye is 11 km. Tatarovo, Yelizarovo, Zabolotnoye are the nearest rural localities.

References 

Rural localities in Vologodsky District